Panayiotis Loizides  (born 28 February 1995) is a Cypriot footballer who plays for Cypriot Second Division club Alki Oroklini. He plays as a right-back.

Club career
Panayiotis Loizides made his debut for Anorthosis Famagusta in a match against Apoel Nicosia.

On 27 June 2019, Loizides joined Ermis Aradippou FC.

References

External links
 

1995 births
Living people
Cypriot footballers
Cypriot First Division players
Anorthosis Famagusta F.C. players
Nea Salamis Famagusta FC players
Ayia Napa FC players
Omonia Aradippou players
Alki Oroklini players
Ermis Aradippou FC players
Association football defenders